Leonel is a given name. Notable people with the name include:

Leonel Altobelli (born 1986), Argentine footballer
Leonel Álvarez (born 1965), former Colombian football defensive midfielder
Leonel Bastos or Lionel Bastos, singer, songwriter and music producer
Leonel Beaudoin or Léonel Beaudoin (1924–2021), Canadian politician and insurance agent
Leonel Brizola (1922–2004), Brazilian politician
Leonel Campos, baseball player
Leonel Cárcamo (born 1965), retired Salvadoran football player
Leonel Conde, retired Uruguayan football goalkeeper
Fernando Leonel Cortés (born 1988), Mexican football striker
Leonel Cubas (died 2007), football player from El Salvador
Leonel da Silva Araujo, also known as Leonel (born 1986), football player
Léonel de Moustier (1882–1945), French businessman and politician
Leonel Fernández (born 1953), Dominican lawyer, academic, President of the Dominican Republic from 1996 to 2000, and from 2004 to 2012
Leonel Galeano (born 1991), Argentine football defender
Leonel García of Sin Bandera, a Latin pop duo based in Mexico
Leonel Grave de Peralta (born 1976), Cuban activist and dissident
Leonel Guevara (born 1983), Salvadoran footballer
Álvaro Leonel Ramazzini Imeri (born 1947), bishop of the Catholic Church in Guatemala
Leonel Jules, Contemporary Canadian painter from Montreal, Quebec, originally from Haiti
Leonel Kaplan (born 1973), Argentine trumpet player
Leonel Liberman (born 1972), former footballer
Leonel Manzano (born 1984), American cross-country and track and field athlete
Leonel Mário d'Alva (born 1935), São Toméan politician
Leonel Marshall Steward, Sr. (born 1954), Cuban former volleyball player
Leonel Martiniano de Alencar, Baron of Alencar (1832–1921), Brazilian lawyer and diplomat, ambassador of Brazil
Leonel Medeiros or Lionel Medeiros (born 1977), retired Portuguese footballer
Leonel Mena (born 1982), Chilean Midfielder
Leonel Cota Montaño (born 1958), Mexican politician
Leonel Moreira (born 1990), Costa Rican football player
Leonel Moura (born 1948), conceptual artist
Leonel Munder (born 1988), male beach volleyball player from Cuba
Leonel Noriega (born 1975), Guatemalan football midfielder
Leonel Núñez (born 1984), Argentine football striker
Leonel Olmedo (born 1981), Mexican footballer
Leonel Paulo (born 1986), Angolan basketball player
Leonel Pernía (born 1975), Argentine racing driver
Leonel Pilipauskas (born 1975), Uruguayan footballer
Leonel Pontes (born 1972), Portuguese football coach
Leonel Power (1370–1445), English composer of the late Medieval and early Renaissance eras
Leonel Godoy Rangel (born 1950), Mexican lawyer, politician and former Governor of Michoacán
Leonel Reyes (born 1976), Bolivian football midfielder
Leonel Ríos (born 1983), Argentine football midfielder
Leonel Rocco (born 1966), former Uruguayan footballer
Leonel Herrera Rojas (born 1978), former Chilean footballer
Leonel Romero (born 1987), Peruvian football defender
Leonel Saint-Preux (born 1985), Haitian footballer
Leonel Sánchez (born 1936), former professional football player
Leonel Sharp (1559–1631), English churchman and courtier, royal chaplain, archdeacon of Berkshire
Leonel Herrera Silva (born 1971), former Chilean footballer
Leonel "Bebito" Smith (1909–2000), Cuban multiple gold medalist swimmer at the 1926 Central American Games in Mexico City
Leonel Suárez (born 1987), male decathlete from Cuba
Leonel Vangioni (born 1987), Argentine football left-winger
António Leonel Vidigal or Toni Vidigal (born 1975), retired Portuguese professional footballer
Leonel Vieira (born 1969), Portuguese film director
Leonel Vielma (born 1978), Venezuelan football defender
Luciano Leonel Cuello (born 1984), Argentine boxer in the Light Middleweight division
Marcos Leonel Posadas (born 1938), Mexican politician
Marvin Leonel Esch (1927–2010), politician from the U.S. state of Michigan
Sergio Leonel "Kún" Agüero del Castillo or Sergio Agüero (born 1988), Argentine footballer

See also
Laionel
Leonela
Lionel (disambiguation)
Lyonel